Shyam Sundar Chakravarthy (alternately spelled as Shyam Sundar Chakravarty or Shyam Sundar Chakravarti, 12 July 1869 – 7 September 1932) was an Indian revolutionary, independence activist and journalist from Bengal. He was born in Bharenga, Pabna in Bengal Presidency (currently in Bangladesh). He belonged to the "Pabna Group" of Bengali revolutionaries along with Abinash Chakravarty and Annada Kaviraj. In 1905 he was the sub-editor of the revolutionary journal Sandhya. In 1906, he joined with Bengali nationalist newspaper Bande Mataram as an assistant to its editor Sri Aurobindo and later became its editor. In 1908, he was deported to Burma. Later he became an adherent of the non violent methods of Indian National Congress and an office bearer of the Swaraj Party. He founded and edited the newspaper "The Servant" in 1920 to promote the Non-cooperation movement.

Works
 Through Solititude and Sorrow
 My Mother's Face

References

Indian revolutionaries
Indian National Congress politicians
1869 births
1932 deaths
Bengali writers
People from Pabna District
19th-century Indian journalists
20th-century Indian journalists
Indian independence activists from West Bengal